Beckwith Island is the eastern of three islands in southeastern Georgian Bay in Ontario, Canada. Beckwith Island and the attached "Little Beckwith" are part of the Beausoleil First Nation.

Geography 
Like its populated neighbour Christian Island to the west, and Hope Island to the northwest, the uninhabited island is part of an Ojibwa reserve. On the mainland, Cedar Point lies directly south of the island and Thunder Beach is located to the southeast of Beckwith Island.

Flora and fauna 
The island is an ecologically sensitive island of over 800 acres (324 ha), featuring sandy beaches and dunes, juniper bushes, as well as the rare and protected three-pronged awn grass, plus forests of oak, maple, birch and conifer trees and no development of any kind except for simple outhouses to serve boaters, campers and picnickers.

Accessibility 
Beckwith Island is undeveloped, though there are two boat anchorage points. One on the north and another on the south side of the islands where the narrows of the two islands meet. Sandy beaches are at both anchorage points.

References 

Uninhabited islands of Ontario
Anishinaabe reserves in Ontario
Islands of Georgian Bay